The Good Oil is a musical comedy with book, music and lyrics by Coralie Condon. It is set during the 1954-55 West Australian oil boom in Perth and an oil camp in the north of Western Australia.

The musical premiered in November 1958 at the Playhouse in Perth for the city's National Theatre.

The musical was adapted for radio on the  ABC in 1959 with Toni Lamond.

1965 TV Version
A television version with Kevin Johnston and Jill Perryman was produced in 1965 by TVW-7 in Perth. It was directed by Max Bostock.

Cast
Jill Perryman
Kevan Johnston

See also
A Sleep Of Prisoners (1961)
Portrait Of A Star (1963)
The Rose and Crown (1963)

References

External links
Opening number "Got the Good Oil" at You Tube
"Don't Quote Me" at You Tube
"I'm Doing It All For You" at You Tube

Australian musicals
1958 musicals
Musical television films
1960s Australian television plays